Paul Douglas Hillier OBE (born 9 February 1949) is an English conductor, music director and baritone. He specializes in both early and contemporary classical music, especially that by composers Steve Reich and Arvo Pärt. He was a co-founder of the Hilliard Ensemble and directed the Estonian Philharmonic Chamber Choir for many years. He has been Chief Conductor of Ars Nova (Copenhagen) since 2003, and Artistic Director and Chief Conductor of the National Chamber Choir of Ireland since 2008.

Ensembles
Hillier was born in Dorchester, England in 1949, where he attended Hardye's Grammar School. In 1967 he became a music student at the Guildhall School of Music & Drama, studying voice.

In 1974 he co-founded the Hilliard Ensemble along with fellow vicar-choral Paul Elliott, tenor, and counter-tenor David James. His concert debut was in 1974 in London's Purcell Room. Hillier remained the director of the ensemble until 1990, when he founded Theatre of Voices. In addition to early music, this group explores more contemporary repertoire.  With the Chicago-based ensemble His Majestie's Clerkes Hillier recorded early American repertoire such as the works of William Billings on the 1992 album A Land of Pure Delight.

Hillier later became Director of the Early Music Institute at the Indiana University Jacobs School of Music where he conducted the Pro Arte Singers. He left the E.M.I. in 2003, having meanwhile become Artistic Director and Principal Conductor of the Estonian Philharmonic Chamber Choir; he left the position in 2007.

Since 2003, Hillier has made his home in Copenhagen, where he is Chief Conductor of Ars Nova (Copenhagen). In 2008, he was appointed Artistic Director and Chief Conductor of the National Chamber Choir of Ireland. He continues to work with his own group, Theatre of Voices.

Hillier has recorded a number of solo albums, some with harpist Andrew Lawrence-King on the Harmonia Mundi, ECM, EMI, Finlandia and Hyperion labels.

Academic appointments
From 1980, Hillier has held a variety of academic appointments over the years, most recently as Director of the Early Music Institute at Indiana University Bloomington.

Publications
The Catch Book (1987), Oxford University Press, a collection of catches (comic rounds) edited by Hillier.
A Josquin Anthology (2005), Oxford University Press, a collection of choral pieces by Renaissance composer Josquin des Prez, edited by Ross Duffin and Hillier.
Writing on Music, 1965–2000 (2002), Oxford University Press, a collection of writings by composer Steve Reich, edited by Hillier.
Arvo Pärt (1997), Oxford University Press, The first English-language study (including a short biography) of Estonian composer Arvo Pärt.
English Romantic Partsongs (1986), Oxford University Press, a collection of songs edited by Hillier.
300 Years of English Partsongs: Glees, Rounds, Catches, Partsongs 1600-1900 (1983), Faber & Faber, a collection of music edited by Hillier.

References

External links
 Paul Hillier on Bach-Cantatas
 Paul Hillier on Harmonia Mundi
 

English operatic baritones
British performers of early music
Founders of early music ensembles
Grammy Award winners
People from Dorchester, Dorset
1949 births
Living people